Soul Circus is the fifth album by Victor Wooten, released in 2005. Wooten claims he took inspiration from what played in radio stations in the 1970s, so most songs have lyrics to them.

Track listing
"Intro: Adam" (V. Wooten) – 0:09
"Victa" (Bootsy Collins, Future Man, V. Wooten) – 4:54
"Bass Tribute" (Future Man, V. Wooten) – 5:11
"Prayer" (Divinity Roxx, Saundra Williams, V. Wooten) – 5:47
"Natives" (V. Wooten) – 4:00
"Can't Hide Love" (Skip Scarborough) – 4:36
"Stay" (V. Wooten) – 4:56
"On and On" (Speech, Saundra Williams, V. Wooten) – 4:52
"Cell Phone" (Count Bass D, Divinity Roxx, V. Wooten) – 4:22
"Back To India" (Speech, V. Wooten) – 4:31
"Soul Circus" (V. Wooten) – 4:29
"Higher Law" (V. Wooten) – 4:34
"Take U There" (V. Wooten) – 0:28
"Ari's Eyes" (V. Wooten) – 4:59
"Outro: Kids" (Kalia Wooten, Adam Wooten, Arianna Wooten) – 0:08
"Bass Tribute (Reprise)" (V. Wooten) – 2:24

Personnel
Victor Wooten - Bass guitar, Tenor bass, Drum Programming, Keys, Vocals, Background Vocals, Electronic drums, Sitar Bass, Double bass, Drums, Production
Steve Bailey - bass, vocals, fretless bass, acoustic bass
J.D. Blair - drums
Oteil Burbridge - vocals
Dennis Chambers - drums
T.H. Subash Chandran - ghatam, konnakol, vocal percussion, jaw harp, moorsing
Alvin Chea- vocals
Jeff Coffin - saxophone
Bootsy Collins - vocals
Count Bass D - rap
John Cowan - vocals
Bill Dickens - vocals
Future Man- keyboards, vocals, voices
Gary Grainger - vocals
Barry Green - trombone
K. B. Ganesh Kumar - kanjira
Keith Leblanc - vocals
Will Lee - bass, vocals
Howard Levy- harmonica
Raymond Massey - drums, snare drum
Christian McBride - vocals
Rod McGaha - trumpet
Bill Miller - flute, shaker, frame drum
Rhonda Smith - vocals
Speech - vocals, rap
T. M. Stevens - bass, vocals
Kurt Storey - bass, voices
Shawn "Thunder" Wallace - saxophone
Saundra Williams - vocals
Holly Wooten- background vocals
Kaila Wooten - vocals
Regi Wooten - guitar, nylon-string guitar
Roy Wooten - cajón, box
Divinity Roxx - vocals/rap

External links
Victor Wooten official website
Soul Circus album website

2005 albums
Victor Wooten albums